Citadel: Adventure of the Crystal Keep is a fantasy adventure video game developed by Postcraft International, Inc. and released in 1989.  The game was developed for the Macintosh.

Plot
The player must rescue Lady Synd from a citadel, where the wizard Nequilar holds her captive.

Reception
The game was reviewed in 1990 in Dragon #155 by Hartley, Patricia, and Kirk Lesser in "The Role of Computers" column. The reviewers gave the game 5 out of 5 stars. Dave Arneson for Computer Gaming World called Citadel "very disappointing". The magazine liked its graphics and audio, but described the story as "run-of-the-mill" and the combat as poor.

Reviews
Compute!

References

1989 video games
Adventure games
Classic Mac OS games
Classic Mac OS-only games
Video games developed in the United States
Video games set in castles